Gervan or Garrevan may refer to:
 Gervan, Fars
 Gervan, Sistan and Baluchestan